George Burns Comedy Week is a comedy anthology television series broadcast in the United States by CBS as part of its 1985 fall lineup, hosted by George Burns.

Overview
As he was age 89 when the show premiered, George Burns was billed as the oldest person ever to "star" in a television series.  Burns had been around television in one way or another since shortly after its inception; like many old-time radio stars he had brought his routine over more-or-less intact from the older medium.  However, his actual role in this series was rather slight; aside from lending his name, introducing the night's program, and providing an occasional voice-over narration, Burns was not involved in any of the episodes as an actor and those who tuned in expecting to see him as such were disappointed.

Several well-known comedians appeared in episodes of this show, including Joe Piscopo, Robert Klein, Don Rickles, Martin Mull, Don Knotts, and Howard Hesseman.  The show is probably best known for two particular segments, one being "Christmas Carol II: The Sequel" in which an adult Tiny Tim has come to exhibit many of the characteristics once defining his father's old boss, Ebenezer Scrooge, and another starring Valerie Perrine and Harvey Korman in what proved to be the pilot for their short lived sitcom, Leo & Liz in Beverly Hills.

Episodes

Reception
George Burns Comedy Week did poorly in the Nielsen ratings and was last broadcast on Christmas night 1985.  It marked Burns' last ongoing role in a television series, although he continued to appear as a guest on programs for the next nine years, until suffering a serious fall at age 98 which ended his active performing career (Burns died at age 100).

References
 Brooks, Tim and Marsh, Earle, The Complete Directory to Prime Time Network and Cable TV Shows

External links
 

1985 American television series debuts
1985 American television series endings
CBS original programming
1980s American comedy television series
1980s American anthology television series
Television series by Universal Television
English-language television shows
George Burns